The Roman Catholic Diocese of Denpasar is a diocese of the Ecclesiastical province of Ende, in Indonesia. The diocese encompasses the predominantly Hindu province of Bali and the mostly Muslim province of West Nusa Tenggara and has its see in Denpasar, the capital city of Bali.

History
 July 10, 1950: Established as Apostolic Prefecture of Denpasar from the Apostolic Vicariate of Isole della Piccola Sonda
 January 3, 1961: Promoted as Diocese of Denpasar

Leadership
 Bishops of Denpasar (Roman rite)
 Bishop Silvester Tung Kiem San (November 22, 2008 - )
 Bishop Benyamin Yosef Bria (April 14, 2000 – September 18, 2007)
 Bishop Vitalis Djebarus, S.V.D. (September 4, 1980 – September 22, 1998)
 Bishop Antoine Hubert Thijssen, S.V.D. (Apostolic Administrator 1973 – September 4, 1980)
 Bishop Paul Sani Kleden, S.V.D. (July 4, 1961 – November 17, 1972)
 Prefects Apostolic of Denpasar (Roman Rite) 
 Fr. Uberto Hermens, S.V.D. (July 19, 1950 – 1961)

References

External links
 GCatholic.org
 Catholic Hierarchy

Denpasar
Roman Catholic dioceses in Indonesia
Christian organizations established in 1950
Roman Catholic dioceses and prelatures established in the 20th century
1950 establishments in Indonesia
Religion in Bali